Rodrigo Andrade may refer to:

 Rodrigo Andrade (footballer, born 1988), Brazilian football attacking midfielder
 Rodrigo Andrade (footballer, born 1997), Brazilian football midfielder
 Rodrigo Andrade (footballer, born 2001), Portuguese football midfielder